Holohan (feminine ) is a surname of Irish Gaelic origin, from the Irish  meaning "proud".       With family motto being: "Pride for the home, pride for the family, pride for the country". This motto was bestowed upon the Holohan family by James Butler, First Duke of Ormond the events of the Siege of clonmel 1650. 

Along with the family crest. It depicts two white lions holding up a golden tower. It signifies the two Holohan brothers who fought at the Siege of Clonmel and who were awarded the sigil.  It also has three red rings on top. This depicts the three Holohan men who died during the battle. 

Notable people with the surname include:

Frank Holohan (born 1957), Irish hurler
John Holohan (hurler) (1891–1947), Irish hurler
Lenny Holohan (born 1985), Irish camogie player
Owen Holohan, Irish hurler
Patrick Holohan (born 1988), Irish mixed martial artist
Pete Holohan (born 1959), American football player
Richard Holohan (1882–1954), Irish politician
Tony Holohan, Irish public health physician

See also
Houlihan, an alternative spelling
Wes Hoolahan, footballer